West of England geese are a breed of auto-sexing domestic goose.

Description
West of England geese are a rare or heritage breed of medium-sized geese. They were originally found across the south of England in particular in Devon and Cornwall. They are auto-sexing, meaning that one can identify females by their grey markings on head and back immediately after hatching.
 
West of England geese have blue eyes, an orange bill, a dual-lobed paunch and a calm temperament. They weigh between 6 and 9 kg. The gander is white and sometimes shows some traces of grey. The female goose has clear grey markings on head, neck, back and the thigh coverts.

See also
List of goose breeds

References
 British Waterfowl Association (2008): British Waterfowl Standards: Welshpool Printing Group, Wales.

External links
West of England geese on geese.ch

Goose breeds
Animal breeds on the RBST Watchlist
Rare breed conservation
Agriculture in the United Kingdom